These are lists of Billboard magazine's "Top Country & Western Records" for 1951, ranked by retail sales and juke box plays.

Overview
Hank Williams' "Cold, Cold Heart" was 1951's No. 1 country hit based on retail sales and No. 6 based on juke box plays. Lefty Frizzell's "I Want to Be with You Always" ranked No. 1 based on juke box plays and No. 2 based on retail sales. The year's other top hits included: Frizzell's "Always Late with Your Kisses" (No. 2 retail, No. 2 juke box), Hank Snow's "The Rhumba Boogie" (No. 4 retail, No. 5 juke box), Eddy Arnold's "I Wanna Play House With You" (No. 2 juke box, No. 5 retail), and Tennessee Ernie Ford's "The Shotgun Boogie" (No. 4 juke box, No. 7 retail).

Leading artists and labels
The Billboard year-end charts were cited as proof that Lefty Frizzell was "the nation's number one western and country recording star." Frizzell led all other artists with seven records appearing on the Billboard year-end charts. Eddy Arnold placed second with six records followed by Hank Williams (five), Hank Snow (five), and Carl Smith (three).

The RCA Victor and Columbia labels dominated the 1951 year-end country charts, with 14 records from RCA Victor and 12 from Columbia. Decca, which had dominated the 1950 year-end country charts with 11 records, managed to land only one record on the 1951 year-end charts.

Other promulgators
While Billboard is considered the authoritative source, at least one other publisher, Music VF, created its own list of the top country hits of 1951. Music VF's list was led by (1) "Slow Poke" by Pee Wee King, (2) "Mockin' Bird Hill" by Les Paul and Mary Ford, (3) "On Top of Old Smoky" by The Weavers, (4) "Down Yonder" by Del Wood, and (5) "Mockin' Bird Hill" by the Pinetoppers.

Country music in 1951

During the early 1950s, there was tremendous growth in the popularity of country music, as artists like Eddy Arnold sold records at a level that rivaled Bing Crosby, Frank Sinatra, and other top pop artists. Patti Page's "Tennessee Waltz", produced and recorded in Nashville, crossed over to become a No. 1 hit on pop charts in 1951, and "more than any other single song, established Nashville as a source of songs for the pop market. Hank Williams' "Cold, Cold Heart" was another prominent example of country music crossing over in 1951; the song was such a massive hit that five versions reached the pop Top 30, and Tony Bennett's version spent six weeks at No. 1. The creation of a separate Billboard chart to track the top country hits confirmed the increased importance of the genre.

Top records

See also
List of Billboard number-one country songs of 1951
Billboard year-end top 30 singles of 1951
1951 in country music

Notes

References

1951 record charts
Billboard charts
1951 in American music